Timothy Jerrell Price (born June 16, 1993) is an American basketball player for CS Dinamo București of the Liga Națională. He played college basketball for Western Kentucky.

College career 
Price was recruited to play linebacker at Louisiana Tech but instead chose to play basketball for Western Kentucky. He scored 21 points against eventual national champion Kentucky in the 2012 NCAA tournament. As a freshman, Price posted 9.0 points and 4.3 rebounds per game for the Hilltoppers in 2011-12. He led the team in scoring as a sophomore with 15.2 points per game. 

In January 2014, Price missed a game because of a violation of undisclosed team rules. As a junior at Western Kentucky, Price averaged 15.4 points, 4.4 rebounds and 2.0 assists per game and led the Hilltoppers to a second place finish in the Sun Belt conference. He missed the regular season finale versus Georgia State due to a shoulder injury. Price was named to the Second-team All-Sun Belt. He earned Conference USA Player of the Week after scoring 26 points, pulling down 10 rebounds and posting five assists in the Hilltoppers' 81-74 victory against Ole Miss in January. As a senior, he led Conference USA with 17.1 points per game to go with 5.3 rebounds and 4.0 assists per game. Price was named to the First Team All-Conference USA and finished his college career as Western Kentucky's all-time leader in three-pointers with 286. His 1,782 career points ranks sixth all time at the university. Following the season Price participated in the Portsmouth Invitational Tournament, where he averaged 9.7 points and 2.7 assists per game in three contests.

Professional career
After not being chosen in the 2015 NBA Draft, he was invited by the Chicago Bulls to participate in the NBA Summer League, where he played four games, in which he averaged 2.2 points per game. He was subsequently signed by the Lille Métropole BC of the French Pro B, where he played a season in which he averaged 15.4 points, 2.4 assists, and 2.6 rebounds per game. He returned to America to play again the 2016 summer leagues, this time with the Orlando Magic. Price was drafted 17th overall in the D-League draft and signed a contract with the Erie BayHawks. In his first season Price was a starter and averaged 14.4 points and 3.1 rebounds per game. He continued in the team the following season with the new name of Lakeland Magic. 

On July 27, 2018, Price signed with Egis Körmend. He signed with Hong Kong Eastern on September 14, 2019, turning down several offers in Europe. Price played two games in Hong Kong and averaged 20 points and 6.5 rebounds per game. On December 23, he signed with Szolnoki Olajbányász KK. Price averaged 9.6 points, 3.7 rebounds, and 2.9 assists per game. On September 7, 2020, he signed with CS Dinamo București of the Liga Națională.

References

External links 
 Western Kentucky Hilltoppers bio

1993 births
Living people
American expatriate basketball people in France
American expatriate basketball people in Hungary
American expatriate basketball people in China
American men's basketball players
Basketball players from Louisiana
BC Körmend players
Eastern Sports Club basketball players
Erie BayHawks (2008–2017) players
Lakeland Magic players
Lille Métropole BC players
People from Slidell, Louisiana
Shooting guards
Western Kentucky Hilltoppers basketball players
American expatriate basketball people in Hong Kong
ASEAN Basketball League players